The 7th Cavalry Division (7. Kavallerie-Division) was a unit of the German Army in World War I. The division was formed on the mobilization of the German Army in August 1914. The division was disbanded in 1919 during the demobilization of the German Army after World War I.

Combat chronicle 
It was initially assigned to III Cavalry Corps, which preceded 6th Army's advance on the Western Front. In October 1915, it was engaged in occupation duties in Belgium until October 1916, when it relocated to Romania. In January 1917, the division returned to the Western Front and was in Alsace until May 1918, Flanders until August 1918, Artois to October 1918 and back to Flanders until the end of the war. It was dismounted on 14 May 1918 and restructured to form the 7th Cavalry Schützen Division. By the end of the war, it was serving under 64th Corps (z.b.V.), Armee-Abteilung B, Heeresgruppe Herzog Albrecht von Württemberg on the Western Front.

A more detailed combat chronicle can be found at the German-language version of this article.

Order of Battle on mobilisation 
On formation, in August 1914, the component units of the division were:
 26th Cavalry Brigade (from XIII Army Corps District)
 25th (1st Württemberg) Dragoons "Queen Olga"
 26th (2nd Württemberg) Dragoons "King"
 30th Cavalry Brigade (from XV Corps District)
 15th (3rd Silesian) Dragoons Nr. 15
 9th (2nd Rhenish) Hussars
 42nd Cavalry Brigade (from XXI Army Corps District)
 11th (2nd Brandenburg) Uhlans "Count Haeseler"
 15th (Schleswig-Holstein) Uhlans
 Horse Artillery Abteilung of the 15th (1st Upper Alsatian) Field Artillery Regiment
 3rd Machine Gun Detachment
 Pioneer Detachment
 Signals Detachment
 Heavy Wireless Station 26
 Light Wireless Station 13
 Light Wireless Station 15
 Cavalry Motorised Vehicle Column 7

See: Table of Organisation and Equipment

7th Cavalry Schützen Division 

The 7th Cavalry Division was extensively reorganised in the course of the war, culminating in its conversion to a Cavalry Schützen Division, that is to say, dismounted cavalry. Here, the cavalry brigades were renamed Cavalry Schützen Commands and performed a similar role to that of an infantry regiment command. Likewise, the cavalry regiments became Cavalry Schützen Regiments and allocated the role of an infantry battalion (and their squadrons acted as infantry companies). However, these units were much weaker than normal infantry formations (for example, a Schützen squadron had a strength of just 4 officers and 109 NCOs and other ranks, considerably less than that of an infantry company).
 26th Cavalry Brigade became independent on 6 October 1917
 30th Cavalry Brigade renamed 30th Cavalry Schützen Command on 27 May 1918
 42nd Cavalry Brigade became independent on 14 September 1916
 28th Cavalry Brigade joined from 4th Cavalry Division on 17 May 1918 and renamed 28th Cavalry Schützen Command on 27 May 1918
 41st Cavalry Brigade joined from 1st Cavalry Division on 17 October 1916 and renamed 41st Cavalry Schützen Command on 27 May 1918

Late World War I organization 
Allied Intelligence rated this division as 4th Class (of 4 classes). It's late war organisation was:
 21st Landwehr Brigade
 28th Cavalry Schützen Command
 11th (2nd Brandenburg) Uhlans "Count Haeseler"
 15th (Schleswig-Holstein) Uhlans
 4th Reserve Uhlans
 30th Cavalry Schützen Command
 15th (3rd Silesian) Dragoons
 25th (1st Württemberg) Dragoons "Queen Olga"
 9th (2nd Rhenish) Hussars
 41st Cavalry Schützen Command
 5th (West Prussian) Cuirassiers "Duke Frederick Eugene of Württemberg"
 26th (2nd Württemberg) Dragoons "King"
 4th (1st Pomeranian) Uhlans "von Schmidt"
 2nd Squadron, 6th (Brandenburg) Cuirassiers "Emperor Nicholas I of Russia" (mounted cavalry)
 Artillery Command
 Horse Artillery Abteilung of the 1st Guards Field Artillery Regiment
 351st Light Ammunition Column
 717th Light Ammunition Column
 485th Pioneer Battalion
 2nd Company, 19th Pioneer Battalion
 3rd Company, 19th Pioneer Battalion
 2nd Reserve Company, II Pioneer Battalion No. 16
 3rd Cavalry Pioneer Abteilung
 6th Cavalry Pioneer Abteilung
 Signal Command
 Telephone Detachment
 186th Wireless Detachment
 Medical and Veterinary
 34th Ambulance Company
 142nd Field Hospital
 141st Vet. Hospital
 Train
 783rd Motor Transport Column
 Heavy Artillery
 117th Foot Artillery Battalion

See also 

 German Army (German Empire)
 German cavalry in World War I
 German Army order of battle (1914)

References

Bibliography 
 
 
 
 

Cavalry divisions of Germany in World War I
Military units and formations established in 1914
Military units and formations disestablished in 1919